United Nations Security Council resolution 612 was adopted unanimously on 9 May 1988. After considering a report by the Special Mission dispatched by the Secretary-General to investigate alleged use of chemical weapons in the Iran–Iraq War, the Council condemned the use of chemical weapons in the conflict, contrary to obligations under the Geneva Protocol.

The Council reaffirmed the urgency of the strict observance of the Geneva Protocol, expecting both sides to refrain from the future use of chemical weapons. It also urged Member States to continue to apply or establish strict control of chemical products in exports to Iran and Iraq, expressing its desire to further review the situation.

See also
 Iran–Iraq relations
 Iran–Iraq War
 List of United Nations Security Council Resolutions 601 to 700 (1987–1991)
 Resolutions 479, 514, 522, 540, 552, 582, 598, 616, 619 and 620

References
Text of the Resolution at undocs.org

External links
 

1988 in Iran
1988 in Iraq
1988 in military history
Chemical weapons in the Iran–Iraq War
 0612
 0612
May 1988 events